Abramov is a rural locality (a khutor) in Mikhaylovka Urban Okrug, Volgograd Oblast, Russia. The population was 278 as of 2010. There are 23 streets.

Geography 
The khutor is located on the Bezymyanka River, 28 km south of Mikhaylovka (the district's administrative centre) by road. Bezymyanka is the nearest rural locality.

References 

Rural localities in Mikhaylovka urban okrug